Events from the year 1613 in art.

Events
April 27 – Inigo Jones is appointed Surveyor of the King's Works in England.
August 11 – Cesare Corte, after a period imprisoned by the Roman Inquisition, confesses and undergoes a public abjuration of his heretical beliefs.  He dies in prison a few weeks later.

Paintings

Cristofano Allori – Judith with the Head of Holofernes (Palazzo Pitti, Florence)
Jan Brueghel the Elder – The Entry of the Animals Into Noah's Ark
Lavinia Fontana – Minerva Dressing
Hendrik Goltzius – Adam and Eve

Births
February 24 – Mattia Preti, Italian Baroque artist who worked in Italy and Malta (died 1699)
March 12 – André Le Nôtre, landscape architect (died 1700)
April 7 – Gerrit Dou (or Gerard Dow), Dutch painter (died 1675), pupil of Rembrandt
October 12 – Jacques d'Arthois, Flemish Baroque painter who specialized in landscapes (died 1686)
 date unknown
Pier Martire Armani, Italian painter (died 1669)
Gian Pietro Bellori, Italian painter, antiquarian and biographer of artists (died 1696)
Marco Boschini, Italian painter of the early-Baroque period in Venice (died 1678)
Giovanni Maria Bottala, Italian painter (died 1644)
Conrad Buno, German copperplate engraver, cartographer and publisher (died 1671)
Giulio Carpioni, Italian painter and etcher of the early Baroque era (died 1678)
Dirck Cornelis de Hooch, Dutch portrait painter (died 1651)
Pieter de Bailliu, Flemish engraver (died unknown)
Aniella di Beltrano, Italian painter (died 1649)
Cornelis Mahu, Flemish painter (died 1689)
Giovanni Paolo Oderico, Italian painter mainly active in Genoa (died 1657)
Antonio Travi, deaf Italian landscape painter (died 1668)
Giulio Trogli, Italian painter nicknamed il Paradosso ("the Paradox") (died 1685)
Bartholomeus van der Helst, Dutch portrait painter (died 1670)
Jacob van der Roer van Dordrecht, Dutch Golden Age portrait painter (died 1691)

Deaths
February 27 – Pietro Facchetti, Italian painter primarily of portraits (born 1539)
March 13 – Giovanni Battista Caccini, Italian sculptor (born 1556)
March 23 – Jerónimo de Ayanz y Beaumont, Spanish soldier, painter, musician and inventor (born 1553)
March 25 – Taddeo Carlone, Swiss-Italian sculptor and architect (date of birth unknown)
July – Giovan Battista Cavagna, architect, engineer and painter
June 18 – Cigoli, Italian painter and architect of the late Mannerist period (born 1559)
July 19 – Nicolaus van Aelst, Flemish engraver and painter (born 1526)
date unknown
Durante Alberti, Italian painter, member of family of artists (born 1538)
Cesare Corte, Italian painter active mainly in his natal city of Genoa (born 1554)
Ercole dell'Abate, Italian painter (born 1563)
Giovanni Battista da Ponte, Italian painter active in Venice and his native Bassano del Grappa (born 1533)
Simone de Magistris, Italian painter and sculptor (born 1555)
Ventura Salimbeni, Italian Mannerist painter and printmaker (born 1568)

References

 
Years of the 17th century in art
1610s in art